Band Baaja Baaraat (also known as Wedding Planners) is a 2010 Indian Hindi-language romantic comedy film directed by Maneesh Sharma in his directorial debut from a screenplay by Habib Faisal, and produced by Aditya Chopra for Yash Raj Films. It stars Anushka Sharma and Ranveer Singh in his debut lead acting role. In the film, Shruti Kakkar (Sharma) and Bittoo Sharma (Singh) team up to create a wedding planning enterprise.

Band Baaja Baaraat released worldwide on 10 December 2010, and proved to be a commercial success, despite initial competition from No Problem and Tees Maar Khan. Upon release, it received widespread critical acclaim, with praise for its novel setting, screenplay, soundtrack and the leads' performances. 

At the 56th Filmfare Awards, Band Baaja Baaraat received 6 nominations, including Best Film, Best Director (Maneesh Sharma) and Best Actress (Anushka Sharma), and won 2 awards – Best Male Debut (Singh) and Best Debut Director (Maneesh Sharma).

A Tamil remake titled Aaha Kalyanam also produced by Aditya Chopra under the Yash Raj Films banner, starring Nani and Vaani Kapoor in the lead roles was released on 21 February 2014.

Plot
Shruti is a final-year college student who wants to start a wedding-planning business. Bittoo, also in the same college, wants to avoid becoming a farmer like the rest of his family. He begs Shruti to let him work with her, so he can put off going back home after graduation. Shruti agrees, on the condition that they keep their relationship strictly professional, never trying to get romantically involved. Together, they start a company called Shaadi Mubarak (lit. Happy Wedding), which manages weddings for clients in Delhi. Soon, their business becomes a success with a steady stream of local, middle-class clients. 

Bittoo wants to break into a higher market segment, so they pitch their company to a young couple, who are looking to have a typical, Indian-style "loud" wedding. Their parents, who are industrialists, are harder to convince, but they agree to hire Bittoo and Shruti for the event. The wedding becomes a huge success, and Bittoo and Shruti throw a party to celebrate. Guests drink into the late hours of the night. They slowly depart leaving Bittoo and Shruti alone with each other. Drunk from the night's events, they end up sleeping together, something that Bittoo immediately regrets. He is worried about the fallout this will have on their work-relationship, and is afraid Shruti might fall in love with him. He starts being awkward around Shruti, who brings up the topic. After discussing the encounter with each other, they agree to return to their original no-romance policy, and go about planning their next wedding. 

The event goes off well in typical Shaadi Mubarak style, but Shruti is still irked over Bittoo having treated her as a one-night stand. She yells at him and asks to break up the business. The next day, Bittoo leaves Shaadi Mubarak and sets up his own rival company. The two go about growing their respective businesses, taking turns to sabotage the other. Slowly, their reputations suffer as clients start to complain. Their debts grow as disgruntled clients are unwilling to pay. Despite all of this, neither is willing to make peace with the other. A few months later, Shruti and Bittoo are both called to a joint meeting with a wealthy client, who wants his daughter's wedding planned by Shaadi Mubarak. He is not interested in their separate companies, but is willing to offer them the job if they work together. With business prospects drying up, they agree to do so for one event, and hire a team to plan the wedding. 

The initial ceremonies go off smoothly, but Bittoo notices that Shruti seems distracted. He soon finds out that she has agreed to marry a groom chosen for her by her parents, for whom she will leave her business and move to another country. He confronts her, causing them to argue again. This time, Shruti slaps him and calls him immature. Bittoo finally realizes that he loves her, and that he drove her away when he treated their night together as a casual encounter. He calls up her fiancé and tells him everything, knowing he will convey this to Shruti. When Shruti finds out that Bittoo loves her as well, she calls off her engagement. The two agree to permanently work together again, and end up getting married. Their wedding, planned for them by themselves, takes place in typical Shaadi Mubarak fashion.

Cast
Anushka Sharma as Shruti Kakkar
Ranveer Singh as Bittoo Sharma
 Neeraj Sood as Maqsood, florist
 Puru Chibber as Mika, Bittoo's best friend
 Manish Choudhary as Sidhwani
 Manit Joura as Sunny, cameraman
 Sushil Dahiya as Brigadier Brar
 Revant Shergill as Santy, musician
Manu Rishi as Inspector (special appearance)
 Govind Pandey as Bittoo's father
 Vinod Verma as Shruti's father
 Nirupama Chopra as Shruti's mother
 Pushvinder Rathore as Shruti's sister
 Shena Gamat as Chanda Narang, a famous wedding planner
 Manmeet Singh as Rajinder Singh, caterer
 Shireena Sambyal as Sonia

Production

Casting

Anushka Sharma was given the female lead in the film, completing the three-film contract she signed to do Rab Ne Bana Di Jodi (2008), her first film. Her role was described as "challenging" by media publications prior to the film's release. Describing the way the lead characters in the film talk as "crude but cute", the actress declared that the hardest part of her job was speaking like a typical Delhi wali girl, which called for her to "talk fast, sometimes mix words and even omit words completely". Director Maneesh Sharma, with whom she's been great friends since her first film, said that the model-turned-actress was a very feisty person, and a natural actress who didn't like doing multiple takes. She described the film as "very much, a young love story set in Delhi".

The male lead was given to Mumbai-native Ranveer Singh, a complete newcomer with no prior acting or modelling experience whatsoever, who impressed producer Aditya Chopra so much that he cast him after his first audition, signing a three-film contract with the actor. Singh, who took acting classes, and hung out at Delhi University prior to shooting said about his casting "I’m the first solo hero Yash Raj is launching. It’s a huge deal for me. I don’t know how I got here. I guess I happened to be in the right place at the right time". As such, this marks the first time a film rests mainly on Sharma's shoulders, as opposed to her prior films Rab Ne Bana Di Jodi and Badmaash Company (2010) where she shared the screen with more experienced co-stars, Shah Rukh Khan and Shahid Kapoor respectively, a fact the actress remarked upon, stating "some people will refer to Band Baaja Baaraat as Anushka Sharma’s film because they have seen me in another film before".

Filming
Filming started in Delhi on 4 February 2010, the same day the production company announcement was made. Singh was very nervous about his first day but was eventually proud that his first scene only took three takes to shoot. An 18 February article by Minakshi Saini for the Hindustan Times entertainment supplement HT City reported that during the previous day's early morning shoot in West Delhi's Subhash Nagar, Singh's newcomer status led many to speculate on whether he was Ranbir Kapoor, Ranvir Shorey or even Riteish Deshmukh. Police officers were eventually called in to secure the set from curious onlookers, however some expressed discontentment at having to be out in the cold despite both lead actors being virtual unknowns. The film features a kiss between the lead actors, which only necessitated a single take. Reportedly, Singh accidentally hit Sharma while filming an undisclosed intense scene. Other than Subhash Nagar DDA Market, locations in Delhi include Janakpuri, Delhi University, North and West Delhi, Ring Road, Mehrauli Farms and Akbar Road. Some scenes were also shot in director Maneesh Sharma's almamater, Hans Raj College in University campus. The film was additionally shot in Mumbai in March and Rajasthan in April.

The assistant directors for the film were Akshat Kapil and Rohit Philip who'd previously held the job on Aaja Nachle (2007) and Do Dooni Chaar (2010) respectively. Aseem Mishra handled the cinematography after working on such films as Contract (2008), New York (2009) and Once Upon a Time in Mumbaai (2010). The various dance sequences were choreographed by Vaibhavi Merchant, who has previously worked on countless films including such hits as Lagaan (2001), Devdas (2002), Veer-Zaara and Swades (both 2004). Sonal Choudhry and T. P. Abid were the film's production designers while Niharika Khan was the costume designer.

Several rumours surrounded the film's shoot, such as speculation that the lead pair were more than just friends. Early media reports alternatively titled the film Shaadi Mubarak or Shaadi Mubarak Ho, however Yash Raj Films eventually issued a press release in late April claiming that this was not the film's title, and that film was actually still untitled. The title was eventually revealed to be Band Baaja Baaraat in late July.

Lead actors Sharma and Singh got along well during the shoot, and are strongly believed to have dated and broken up before the film's release. Speaking about his co-star, Singh declared "She’s intelligent, well-read and great to hang out with. Actually, she’s pretty close to my dream girl". Later, he joked "She is the best co-star I have ever worked with! It's also because she is the only co-star I have ever worked with!".

Post-production
Namrata Rao edited the film.

Soundtrack

The score and songs of the film were composed by the duo Salim–Sulaiman who've composed music for many other Yash Raj Films productions before, including Rab Ne Bana Di Jodi, which had already united lead actress Anushka Sharma with director Maneesh Sharma, who was then still an assistant director. The lyrics to the various songs were written by Amitabh Bhattacharya and playback singers include Sunidhi Chauhan, Benny Dayal, Shreya Ghoshal, Natalie Di Luccio, Himani Kapoor, Harshdeep Kaur, Labh Janjua, Shrraddha Pandit, Master Saleem, Sukhwinder Singh, Amitabh Bhattacharya and Salim Merchant.

The soundtrack was revealed on 19 October 2010, at the Yash Raj Studios in Andheri, Mumbai, and was commercially released on 3 November with a launch event happening at the Reliance TimeOut store in Bandra. The album consists of nine tracks, including two remixes and Yash Raj Films issued a press release giving a description of each track. They described the opening song "Ainvayi Ainvayi" as "a funky, energetic number", "Tarkeebein" as a "youthful song with cool lyrics", "Aadha Ishq" as a "perfect love ballad", "Dum Dum" as a "unique, unabashed item number with a Sufi-rock feel", "Mitra" as "cool and contemporary", "Baari Barsi" as a "superbly re-orchestrated" traditional Punjabi wedding song and "Band Baaja Baaraat (Theme)" as "a pulsating track which perfectly represents the spirit of the movie".

Reception
Critical reception for the soundtrack was mixed-to-positive, with "Ainvayi Ainvayi" receiving particular praise (SawfNews even stated that one would "probably want to see the movie just for this song") and agreeing that the album was a superior effort than the composing duo's previous solo soundtrack for Teen Patti (2010), while several criticized the track "Dum Dum" and lamented the similarity to previous Salim–Sulaiman scores. Writing for ApunKa Choice, Usha Lakra titled her review "Band, Baaja, Bland" and noted that while "the album has its moments" and "the tracks are composed strictly keeping in mind the theme of the movie", all-in-all "Ainvayi Ainvayi" was the only chartbuster of the album. Lakra listed "Ainvayi Ainvayi", "Aadha Ishq" and "Band Baaja Baaraat (Theme)" as the album's best tracks. Prateeksha Khot of Bolly Spice only truly disliked "Dum Dum" and praised the "unconventional" lyrics by Amitabh Bhattacharya, but felt the album failed "to live up to the expectations generated by the initial tracks" and criticized the similarities with previous Salim-Sulaiman efforts such as Rocket Singh: Salesman of the Year (2009) and Aaja Nachle (2007). The Economic Times writer Ruchika Kher gave a positive review, describing the album as a "fun-filled soundtrack" and noting the similarities between "Tarkeebein" and compositions by A. R. Rahman. Music Aloud also published a positive review, noting that while the soundtrack wasn't Salim–Sulaiman's best, it was still "a definite winner with some fantastic tracks". The reviewer however did dislike the song "Dum Dum", and remarked that while "Ainvayi Ainvayi" resembled the song "Dance Pe Chance" from Rab Ne Bana Di Jodi, it was "far more engaging". One of the album's most enthusiastic reviews was written by Joginder Tuteja for Bollywood Hungama. Tuteja described the music as "one of the better soundtracks that one has heard from the house of Yash Raj Films in the last couple of years", "one of the best works of Salim-Sulaiman" and "much more than just a regular fun album". He selected "Ainvayi Ainvayi", "Aadha Ishq" and "Dum Dum (Sufi Mix)" as the disc's best tracks. Moviehattans Gurpreet Bhuller also liked the soundtrack, which he described as a "quality album" with "a good collection of songs".

Release

Marketing

As with all films from the studio since Mohabbatein (2000), publicity design was handled by Fayyaz Badruddin. Stills were taken by Abhay Singh and Zahir Abbas Khan.

Prior to the film's release, Anushka Sharma referred to it as her "best film till date". Band Baaja Baaraats trailer and official website were both unveiled on 19 October 2010, a couple of months before the theatrical release. In addition to the film's synopsis and trailer, the website initially also contained five wallpapers and a press kit for visitors to download. The number of available wallpapers later grew to twenty-five and the website eventually allowed visitors to send e-cards to their acquaintances, with the virtual cards dubbed "Band Baaj-O-Grams". A number of contests were organized by Yash Raj Films, including one where the company, along with partners Radio Mirchi and BIG Cinemas, offered the winning couple a free wedding in December, in time for the film's release and supposedly planned the film's heroes, and another in which a couple would win a trip to Switzerland and visit the filming locations of the various Yash Raj Films productions to have been shot there. In addition to the website, Yash Raj Films also had regularly updated official pages on Facebook and Twitter and a Blogspot blog in an effort to reach the widest audience possible. The company finally uploaded a number of videos on their YouTube account, including the trailer but also several videos promoting the songs "Tarkeebein" and "Ainvayi Ainvayi".

On 21 October, lead actors Anushka Sharma and Ranveer Singh went to the Indian Institute of Technology Delhi with director Maneesh Sharma to take part in their annual festival and promote the film. The next day, the trio appeared at the GIP Mall in Noida. On 26 October, a fight broke out between Ranveer Singh and a man alternatively described as a 29-year-old called Uday Khanolkar or a 30-year-old called Uday Sahay. The incident occurred on Kingfisher Airlines flight IT 331 from Mumbai to Delhi, where both Singh and Anushka Sharma were travelling in business class to promote the movie. The two actors noticed a passenger taking pictures of them with his cellphone, and demanded that he hand over his phone so that they could delete the pictures. The man refused and claimed to be an IAS officer. The ensuing argument grew so heated that the cabin crew had to intervene and both parties went to the police station upon arrival and stayed there for over an hour and a half, eventually sorting the matter out amicably without lodging any complaints.

Prior to Band Baaja Baaraats release, some pundits have expressed doubts that the film would be successful, citing the middling response to Yash Raj Films' last few productions, the lack of a male star and the fact that the female lead, Anushka Sharma, was by then an "almost-forgotten" actress. Some have even speculated that the 22-year-old's career might not thrive for much longer with her three-film contract with Yash Raj Films being over.

Theatrical run
On 24 September 2010, Yash Raj Films announced that the film would release worldwide on 10 December of that year, almost two years since the release of Anushka Sharma's debut Rab Ne Bana Di Jodi. Some people have speculated that this was not coincidence but an attempt to repeat the success of her first film.

Critical reception
Upon release, Band Baaja Baaraat received universal critical acclaim. Taran Adarsh of Bollywood Hungama gave it 4/5 stars commenting, "Thankfully, Band Baaja Baaraat works on every level. The writing is crisp, the execution of the material [director: Maneesh Sharma] is worthy and the lead actors [Anushka, Ranveer] steer the film to the destination smoothly. Of course, there are minor hiccups halfway through the film, but the fact remains that Band Baaja Baaraat is, without doubt, one of the most appealing films to come out of the production house. Final word? Band Baaja Baaraat is honest, fresh, youthful and extremely entertaining. Recommended!" Pankaj Sabnani of Glamsham gave it 4.5/5 stars and wrote,"There's an interesting blend of humour, drama and romance in the film. It's replete with great scenes. Make sure you join the celebrations and groove with this Band Baaja Baaraat. Strongly recommended!" Anupama Chopra of NDTV awarded it 4/5 stars and commented, "Band Baaja Baaraat is reasonably entertaining. It's definitely the most fun you'll have in a theater this weekend." Rajeev Masand gave it 3/5 stars writing, "Band Baaja Baaraat works because it’s invested with an earnestness that’s become increasingly rare to find at the movies I’m going with 3/5 for director Maneesh Sharma’s Band Baaja Baaraat. It’s a romantic comedy done correctly. Fun, but with warmth at its heart. Don’t miss it!" Nikhat Kazmi of The Times of India gave the film 3/5 stars and opined,"As long as you view Band Baaja Baaraat as a loving, heartfelt take on what makes Delhi go dhak-dhak, the film holds your attention. Band Baaja Baaraat engages you with its fond look at fun-loving Dilliwalas." Sonal Dedhia of Rediff gave it 3/5 commenting,"On the whole, Band Baaja Baaraat is a refreshing film—very different from the usual romantic comedy movies we're so used to. It is a well-made film that should connect with the audience. Give this one a chance, you won't regret it."

Box office

The movie had an opening of below  60 million. It grossed  280.0 million in the first weekend. The movie grossed  340.0 million in week 2, taking 2 weeks collection to  620 million. It earned  700.1 million. The film was declared an "hit" by Box Office India. It earned approx  965.1 million in its full theatrical run.

Awards and nominations 

56th Filmfare Awards:
Won
 Best Male Debut – Ranveer Singh
 Best Debut Director – Maneesh Sharma
Nominated
 Best Film
 Best Director – Maneesh Sharma
 Best Actress – Anushka Sharma
 Best Scene of the Year

12th IIFA Awards:
 Best Actress – Anushka Sharma
 Star Debut of the Year – Male – Ranveer Singh
 Hottest Pair – Anushka Sharma & Ranveer Singh
 Best Costume Design – Niharika Khan
 Best Editing – Namrata Rao
 Best Song Recording – Vijay Dayal (for "Ainvayi Ainvayi")

2011 Star Screen Awards:
Won
 Most Promising Newcomer - Male – Ranveer Singh
Most Promising Debut Director – Maneesh Sharma
 Best Dialogue – Habib Faisal
 Best Editing – Namrata Rao
Nominated
 Best Film
 Best Director – Maneesh Sharma
 Best Actress – Anushka Sharma
 Best Screenplay – Habib Faisal
 Best Choreography – Vaibhavi Merchant (for "Ainvayi Ainvayi")

6th Apsara Film & Television Producers Guild Awards:
Won
 Best Actress – Anushka Sharma
 Best Male Debut – Ranveer Singh
 Best Debut Director – Maneesh Sharma
 Best Art Direction – Sonal Choudhry and T. P. Abid
 Best Costume Design – Niharika Khan
 Best Editing – Namrata Rao
Nominated:
 Best Film
 Best Female Playback Singer – Sunidhi Chauhan (for "Ainvayi Ainvayi")
 Best Screenplay – Habib Faisal
 Best Dialogue – Habib Faisal
 Best Choreography – Vaibhavi Merchant (for "Ainvayi Ainvayi")

2011 Zee Cine Awards:
Won
 Best Male Debut – Ranveer Singh
Nominated
 Best Actress – Anushka Sharma
 Best Promising Director – Maneesh Sharma
 Best Story – Maneesh Sharma

2011 17th Lions Gold Awards:
 Lions Favourite Debutant Actor – Ranveer Singh
 Lions Favourite Jodi – Anushka Sharma and Ranveer Singh

2011 BIG Star Entertainment Awards:
Nominated
 Most Entertaining Film Actor (Female) – Anushka Sharma
Most Entertaining Film Actor (Male) – Ranveer Singh

2011 Stardust Awards:
Won
 Superstar of Tomorrow (Male) – Ranveer Singh
Nominated
 Best Film – Comedy / Romance
 Best Director – Comedy / Romance – Maneesh Sharma
 Best Actress – Comedy / Romance – Anushka Sharma
 Best Actor – Comedy / Romance – Ranveer Singh
 Hottest New Director – Maneesh Sharma
 New Musical Sensation (Female) – Himani Kapoor (for "Dum Dum")

See also

 Aaha Kalyanam (2014), the Tamil remake of the film
 Jamuna Paar, an Indian TV serial inspired by Band Baaja Baaraat
 Rishta.com (2010), an Indian TV serial produced by YRF on which the film is based
 Jabardasth (2013), a Telugu film inspired from Band Baaja Baaraat
 Bollywood films of 2010

References

External links
 
 
 
 Planning Tips From Wedding Planners

2010 films
2010s Hindi-language films
2010 romantic comedy films
Films shot in Mumbai
Films set in Delhi
Yash Raj Films films
Films shot in Delhi
Films about Indian weddings
Hindi films remade in other languages
Indian romantic comedy films
Films shot in Rajasthan
2010 directorial debut films
Films directed by Maneesh Sharma